Fulton Creek may refer to:

Fulton Creek (North Saskatchewan River), a stream in Canada
Fulton Creek (Ohio), a stream in the United States